The 2017 AFF U-18 Youth Championship was the 15th edition of the AFF U-19 Youth Championship, organised by ASEAN Football Federation. It was hosted by Myanmar during September 2017. Eleven out of the twelve member associations of the ASEAN Football Federation took part in the tournament featuring two groups of five and six teams.

Thailand beat Malaysia 2–0 in the final to secure their fifth regional title.

Participant teams
All of 12 teams from member associations of the ASEAN Football Federation are eligible for the tournament. The reigning ASEAN U-19 champions − Australia did not enter the tournament. At the 9th meeting of the AFF Council, New Zealand were interested to be an invited guest for the AFF U-18 Championship 2017. Official draw were also conducted to decide on the match-ups of the competitions and New Zealand were in Group B. However, New Zealand withdrew from the tournament, based on the latest schedule.
A total of 11 teams from 11 member associations enter the tournament, listed below:

Notes
1 Non-AFF member.

Venues

Squads

Group stage
 All matches were held in Yangon, Myanmar
 All times are local, AIFTA (UTC+6:30).

Group A

Group B

Knockout stage
In the knockout stage, the penalty shoot-out is used to decide the winner if necessary.

Bracket

Semi-finals

Third place match

Final

Winner

Awards

Goalscorers 
8 goals

 Egy Maulana 

7 goals

 Win Naing Tun

6 goals

 Rafli Mursalim
 Myat Kaung Khant

3 goals

 Feby Eka Putra
 Hanis Saghara Putra
 Witan Sulaeman
 Akhyar Rashid
 Hadi Fayyadh
 Pyae Sone Naing
 Danial Mustaffa
 Yuthpichai Lertlum
 Lourenco Ximenes
 Trần Văn Công

2 goals

 Nur Asyraffahmi Norsamri
 Sieng Chanthea
 Muhammad Iqbal
 Bounphachan Bounkong
 Naing Ko Ko
 Jacob Mahler
 Kritsada Kaman
 João Panji
 Bùi Hoàng Việt Anh
 Nguyễn Khắc Khiêm
 Lê Văn Nam
 Lê Xuân Tú
 Nguyễn Hồng Sơn

1 goal

 Sin Kakada
 Touch Kimchay
 Teat Kimheng
 Phom Oy
 Chhoeung Visinu
 Tray Vicheth
 Abdul Mateen Said
 Abdul Wadud Ramli
 Resky Fandi Witriawan
 Chanthachone Thinolath
 Lektoxa Thongsavath
 Phoutthasit Phommachai
 Ammar Alias
 Muhammad Syafiq Danial
 Muhd Zafuan Azeman
 Nik Akif Syahiran Nik Mat
 Nurfais Johari
 Saiful Iskandar
 Shafizi Iqmal
 Eant Maw Oo
 Lwin Moe Aung
 Mariano Suba
 Paludan Tacardon
 Daniel Goh
 Idraki Mohd Adnan
 Katz Ellison
 Mohammad Hassim
 Muhammad Rafiqin
 Chaiwat Weerakitpanit
 Chokanan Saima-in
 Danusorn Somcob
 Ekanit Panya
 Nattawut Chootiwat
 Expedito da Conceicao
 Orcelio da Silva
 Đặng Văn Tới
 Lê Minh Bình
 Mai Sỹ Hoàng
 Trần Bảo Toàn

References

External links

2017
2017 in AFF football
2017 in youth association football
2017 in Burmese football
International association football competitions hosted by Myanmar
September 2017 sports events in Asia